Sir Ralph Bigland (né Owen; 1 May 1757 – 14 July 1838) was an English herald. He was the son of Joseph Owen of Salford, Lancashire, and Elizabeth-Maria Owen (née Bigland).

In 1774, he received royal licence to take the surname and arms of Bigland. He did this out of respect to his maternal uncle, Ralph Bigland, English Officer of Arms, at his uncle's desire.
That same year, he became Rouge Dragon Pursuivant, the first of five heraldic appointments he was to hold in the College of Arms.

Like his uncle, he rose to the most senior office, being appointed Garter Principal King of Arms from 1831 (the same year he was created Knight Bachelor) until his death. He was the last to hold all three Kingships of the College of Arms in succession.

Arms

References 

English officers of arms
1838 deaths
English genealogists
1757 births
Knights Bachelor
Garter Principal Kings of Arms